Felipe Medina Santos (born 27 December 1948) is a Mexican politician affiliated with the Institutional Revolutionary Party. He served as Deputy of the LVI and LIX Legislatures of the Mexican Congress representing the State of Mexico. He also served as municipal president of Chalco from 1979 to 1981 and 1994 to 1995.

References

1948 births
Living people
Politicians from the State of Mexico
Institutional Revolutionary Party politicians
Municipal presidents in the State of Mexico
20th-century Mexican politicians
21st-century Mexican politicians
Instituto Politécnico Nacional alumni
Deputies of the LIX Legislature of Mexico
Members of the Chamber of Deputies (Mexico) for the State of Mexico